Saswata Chatterjee (born 19 December 1970) is an Indian actor of television and films based in Kolkata. Born to actor Subhendu Chatterjee, Saswata Chatterjee began his career with a Hindi serial directed by Saibal Mitra, based on Samaresh Majumdar's Kaalpurush. He gained popularity by portraying the character of Topshe in a Feluda-based television series directed by Sandip Ray. His acting in many Bengali films has been praised by the critics, including his portrayal of a Ritwik Ghatak-inspired character in the 2013 film Meghe Dhaka Tara. He enjoyed success at the national level in Sujoy Ghosh's 2012 blockbuster Hindi film, Kahaani, where he played Bob Biswas, an assassin.

Personal life
Saswata Chatterjee was born on 19 December 1970 to Subhendu Chatterjee, a noted Bengali actor. He lives in Kolkata and is married to Mohua, a teacher. They have a daughter together.

Career
Chatterjee started his career with a Hindi serial directed by Saibal Mitra, based on Samaresh Majumdar's Kaalpurush. and a Hindi serial Krishnakant Ka Vasiyatnama on Doordarshan based on Bankimchandra Chattopadhyay's novel Krishnakanter Will. Later, he acted in a television series directed by Sandip Ray, where he portrayed the character of Topshe, a sidekick of Feluda, the sleuth. After this television debut, his acting skills were appreciated and he gained popularity.

Chatterjee's acting in several Bengali films were critically appreciated. Some of his notable appearances include Tiyasha, C/O Sir, Proloy (2013), Jekhane Bhuter Bhoy, Meghe Dhaka Tara, Bhooter Bhabishyat, Abar Bomkesh (Chitrachor), Rang Milanti, Byomkesh Bakshi (Adim Ripu), The Bong Connection, Abar Aranye. He worked in the blockbuster Hindi film, Kahaani (2012) directed by Sujoy Ghosh  starring Vidya Balan. In that film, he played the role of a cold-blooded killer named Bob Biswas. His role as Bob became so popular that Chatterjee describes it as:

The character went viral on Facebook and Twitter with thousands of followers. A graphic novel is in the making was also inspired from Bob's character.

Meghe Dhaka Tara was released in 2013, a film inspired by the life and works of Bengali film director Ritwik Ghatak and also depicts the socio-political environment of contemporary West Bengal during the Tebhaga and Naxalite movements. In this movie, he played the lead character as Nilkantha Bagchi.

Filmography

Awards
 2021 : West Bengal Film Journalists' Association Award for Best Actor for Chobiyal
 2019 : Best Actor in a Foreign Language Film at Madrid International Film Festival for Shironam.
 2014 : Zee Bangla Gaurav Samman - Best Comedian for Bhooter Bhabishyat
 2012 : Anandalok Award - Best Supporting Actor for Bhooter Bhabishyat
 2011 : Tele Cine Awards - Best Supporting Actor for Byomkesh Bakshi
 2011 : Imphal International Short Film Festival 2012 - Best Supporting Actor for THE FORLORN'

References

External links
 

Living people
1970 births
Bengali male actors
Male actors in Bengali cinema
Bengali male television actors
Male actors from Kolkata
University of Calcutta alumni